Franklin Wharton (July 23, 1767 – September 1, 1818) was the third Commandant of the United States Marine Corps.

Biography
Wharton was born into a prominent Philadelphia, Pennsylvania family, the son of Joseph Wharton. He had forsaken a successful business career to become the Lieutenant of Marines for the frigate United States, which was still part of the War Department. He was quickly promoted to captain in August 1798 and served as officer in charge of the vessel's Marine Detachment until the close of the Quasi-War with France in 1801.

At age 36 and a Marine officer for only five years, he became Lieutenant Colonel and Marine Corps Commandant on March 6, 1804. He was the first Commandant to occupy the Commandant's House, Marine Barracks, Washington, D.C.

As Commandant, Lt. Col. Wharton ordered a detachment of Marines to Georgia and Florida in 1811 to cooperate with United States Army troops in an attempt to subdue an Indian uprising.

Under Wharton's leadership, Marines participated in many important engagements during the War of 1812. They saw action at Annapolis, Fort McHenry, Portsmouth, Craney Island, Bladensburg and New Orleans, and fought under General Henry Dearborn on the northern frontier. At sea, they participated in virtually every important naval battle, serving aboard warships and privateers on the Great Lakes, the Atlantic, and the Pacific.

Marines fought under Commodore Oliver Hazard Perry on Lake Erie and under Commodore Isaac Chauncey on Lake Ontario.

Lieutenant Colonel Commandant Wharton died in office on September 1, 1818, in New York City and was buried in New York's Old Trinity Church Yard.

See also

References

"Lieutenant Colonel Franklin Wharton, USMC". Who's Who in Marine Corps History. History Division, United States Marine Corps. Retrieved 2010-12-29.''

External links
Biography of Franklin Wharton under his ancestor Thomas Wharton Jr.

1767 births
1818 deaths
Military personnel from Philadelphia
United States Marine Corps Commandants
United States Marine Corps officers
United States Marine Corps personnel of the War of 1812
Wharton family
People of colonial Pennsylvania